Byeong Gi Lee is an emeritus professor at Seoul National University, Korea.

Early life
Born in Korea, Lee studied his undergraduate degree at Seoul National University, Korea. He received his Ph.D. degree in electrical engineering from UCLA, USA.

Career
Lee worked at Granger Associates and AT&T Bell Labs before joining SNU, Korea as a faculty member.
He became a professor of electrical engineering and subsequently Vice Chancellor of Research. Later, he
became a Commissioner of the Korean Communications Commission. He was active in IEEE Communications 
Society and had served as the society President. He was also the 23rd President of KICS - Korean Information
and Communications Society. Lee later retired in 2016 as an emeritus professor of SNU.

Awards
Lee was elected to Fellow of the IEEE and member of Korean National Academy of Engineering.

References

South Korean engineers
Seoul National University alumni
University of California, Los Angeles alumni
Academic staff of Seoul National University
Fellow Members of the IEEE
Presidents of the IEEE Communications Society